The DCE Distributed File System (DCE/DFS) is the remote file access protocol used with the Distributed Computing Environment. It was a variant of Andrew File System (AFS), based on the AFS Version 3.0 protocol that was developed commercially by Transarc Corporation. AFS Version 3.0 was in turn based on the AFS Version 2.0 protocol (also used by the Coda disconnected file system) originally developed at Carnegie Mellon University.

DCE/DFS consisted of multiple cooperative components that provided a network file system with strong file system semantics, attempting to mimic the behavior of POSIX local file systems while taking advantage of performance optimizations when possible.  A DCE/DFS client system utilized a locally managed cache that would contain copies (or regions) of the original file.  The client system would coordinate with a server system where the original copy of the file was stored to ensure that multiple clients accessing the same file would re-fetch a cached copy of the file data when the original file had changed.

The advantage of this approach is that it provided very good performance even over slow network connections because most of the file access was actually done to the local cached regions of the file. If the server failed, the client could continue making changes to the file locally, storing it back to the server when it became available again.

DCE/DFS also divorced the concept of logical units of management (Filesets) from the underlying volume on which the fileset was stored.  In doing this it allowed administrative control of the location for the fileset in a manner that was transparent to the end user.  To support this and other advanced DCE/DFS features, a local journaling file system (DCE/LFS also known as Episode) was developed to provide the full range of support options.

IBM has not maintained it since 2005: https://web.archive.org/web/20071009171709/http://www-306.ibm.com/software/stormgmt/dfs/

IBM was working on a replacement for DCE/DFS called ADFS (Advanced Distributed File System).  One major goal of this project was to decouple DFS from the complexities of DCE's cell directory services (CDS) and security services (secd).  Another key feature would have been the elimination of enctype limitations associated with DCE/RPC.  No public mention of this effort has been made since 2005, leading many to believe the project has been killed.

The DCE Distributed File System (DFS) was adopted by the Open Software Foundation in 1989 as part of their Distributed Computing Environment.

See also
 Andrew File System
 Distributed Computing Environment

References

External links
 DCE Official Web Site (archived).
 Some DCE Papers Available On-Line.
 IBM DFS home

Distributed file systems
Network file systems
Internet Protocol based network software